Katalin Bácsics (born 22 November 1973) is a Hungarian sailor. She competed in the women's 470 event at the 1996 Summer Olympics.

References

External links
 

1973 births
Living people
Hungarian female sailors (sport)
Olympic sailors of Hungary
Sailors at the 1996 Summer Olympics – 470
Sportspeople from Keszthely